Darshan Dharmaraj (2 March 1981 – 2 October 2022) was a Sri Lankan actor in film, theatre and television. He made his first television appearance through the Sidney Chandrasekara's teledrama A9. He was awarded Best Actor Awards at several Film festivals in Sri Lanka for his portrayal as ex-LTTE cadre in Asoka Handagama's movie Ini Avan (2012).

Early life and education
Dharmaraj was born in Rakwana, Sabaragamuwa Province, Sri Lanka. He completed education from St. John's Tamil College.

Career
In 2008, Dharmaraj was chosen for Sinhala script by Sydney Chandrasekara's television serial A-Nine. Although he was not fluent with Sinhala at the time, he learnt the language within three months. He began his cinema career with the 2008 film Prabhakaran.

Death
Dharmaraj died from a heart attack at Colombo National Hospital on 2 October 2022, at the age of 41.

Filmography

See also
 Sri Lankan Tamils in Sinhala Cinema

References

External links 

1981 births
2022 deaths
Sri Lankan male film actors
Sri Lankan Tamil actors
People from Ratnapura District